Dulhan (The Bride) is a 1938 social Hindi film directed by Premankur Atorthy. It was produced by the Imperial Film Company. The music direction was by Ram Gopal Pande. The film starred Rattan Bai, W. M. Khan, Ghulam Mohammed and Jilloobai.

Cast
Rattan Bai
W. M. Khan
Ghulam Mohammed
Jilloobai

References

External links

1938 films
1930s Hindi-language films
Films directed by Premankur Atorthy
Indian black-and-white films